Kane is a borough in McKean County in the U.S. state of Pennsylvania,  east by southeast of Erie. It was founded in 1864 by Civil War General Thomas L. Kane of the famous Bucktail Regiment at an elevated site 2210 feet (674 m) above sea level. In the early part of the 20th century, Kane had large glass works, bottle works, lumber mills, and manufactures of brush handles, saws, cutlery, screen doors and windows. The population peaked in the 1920s but has since declined to 3,612 people in 2020.

It is the home of the Kane Area School District, and they are known as the Kane Wolves.

Famous residents of Kane include Chuck Daly, two-time NBA Champion and 1992 Olympic gold medalist coach; Amy Rudolph, an Olympic distance runner and qualifier in the 1996 and 2000 Summer Games; composer Maryanne Amacher; and Evan O'Neill Kane, a surgeon known for removing his own appendix and repairing his own hernia under local anesthetic.

Geography 

Kane is located at  (41.661712, -78.810328).

The above photo is an aerial view of Kane (looking north) taken on May 4, 2008.  Below is an aerial shot of Kane looking northwest.  Click photo for a larger view.

Climate 

Kane has a humid continental climate (Köppen Climate Dfb) with long, snowy winters and warm, humid summers. Lake effect snow during cold snaps in early spring also helps to raise snowfall totals.

Kane is the coldest city in Pennsylvania by annual mean.

Demographics 

As of the census of 2010, there were 3,730 people, 1,758 households, and 1,052 families residing in the borough. The population density was 2,331.25 people per square mile. There were 1,993 housing units at an average density of 1,179.0 per square mile. The racial makeup of the borough was 98.91% White, 0.12% African American, 0.10% Native American, 0.17% Asian, 0.24% from other races, and 0.46% from two or more races. Hispanic or Latino of any race were 0.82% of the population.

There were 1,758 households, out of which 28.4% had children under the age of 18 living with them, 46.9% were married couples living together, 11.4% had a female householder with no husband present, and 38.2% were non-families. 34.4% of all households were made up of individuals, and 18.4% had someone living alone who was 65 years of age or older. The average household size was 2.26 and the average family size was 2.91.

In the borough the population was spread out, with 23.1% under the age of 18, 7.6% from 18 to 24, 26.6% from 25 to 44, 21.9% from 45 to 64, and 20.8% who were 65 years of age or older. The median age was 40 years. For every 100 females there were 86.4 males. For every 100 females age 18 and over, there were 82.5 males.

The median income for a household in the borough was $30,460, and the median income for a family was $38,672. Males had a median income of $32,318 versus $20,907 for females. The per capita income for the borough was $16,167. About 11.1% of families and 13.1% of the population were below the poverty line, including 19.7% of those under age 18 and 12.2% of those age 65 or over.

Recreation 

Kane is a rural community which is rich with outdoor entertainment due to its location near the Allegheny National Forest. Hunting and fishing are very popular forms of entertainment for some people. Other people enjoy visiting such scenic areas as the Kinzua Dam, and the recently destroyed Kinzua Bridge (this railroad bridge was destroyed by a tornado in 2003, and is now the Kinzua Skywalk). In the long winters, people enjoy cross-country skiing, sled riding, winter hiking, and snowmobiling.

For children, the local Evergreen Park has the Evergreen Enchanted Playland Creative Playground. The Evergreen Park also has a nine-hole, 18 tee disc golf course that has annual tournaments in the summer. People of all ages enjoy swimming at the high school public pool that is open various times of the year to give swimming lessons as well as holding recreational swim times.

Each summer, Kane is site of an outdoor drive-in theater playing current movies. It is home to "Art in the Wilds", an outdoor, juried fine arts show held each year in Evergreen Park on the fourth Saturday and Sunday of June, as well as "Kane Fest", an annual festival in July formerly known as the Black Cherry Festival, which is no longer being held.

Kane also holds Glenwood Park, which is great for a nice outdoor family picnic, great time for the kids, playing catch at the baseball fields, or riding bicycles at the skatepark.

Media 

 The Kane Republican — One of two daily newspapers containing both local and national news in McKean County (the other being the Bradford Era). The Republican is an afternoon newspaper, published by the same company as Elk County's newspapers, the St. Marys Daily Press and the Ridgway Record.
 WXZY-LP (FM 101.7) — Established in 2014 as a non-profit community station, 101. 7 WXZY broadcasts a wide variety of musical genres as well as coverage of local events, news, and sports.
 WPSX (FM 90.1) — A repeater of WPSU-FM, the Penn State University-owned NPR affiliate, is licensed to Kane.
 WBYB (FM 103.9) — No longer located in Kane, WBYB was the final incarnation of the station serving Kane at 103.9, (formerly known as WLMI). A longtime country music outlet throughout the 1980s, 1990s and 2000s, as of July 2013, the base of operations and transmitter has been relocated to Eldred, on the other side of the county.
 WQLE (AM 960, defunct) — McKean County's very first local radio station, first signing on the air as WADP in 1954.  The call letters were changed to WKZA in the 1970s and to its last call sign, WQLE, circa 1990.  The station fell silent in late 1992 and has not returned to the air since.  Its tower and studio building, located south of Kane, were dismantled in the late 1990s.
 WCOT (FM 88.3) —  The "Family Life Network" has a radio translator in Kane.

Radio stations based in and around Warren and Saint Marys are also audible in the Kane area.

No television stations currently serve the Kane region, with the only television service coming from cable and satellite providers. For the purpose of designated market areas, Kane is at the southwestern corner of the Buffalo television market but is geographically closer to the Central Pennsylvania market. Both markets' stations (as well as, occasionally, those of the Erie market, whose DMA ends in neighboring Warren County) are seen on local cable and satellite providers.

Nicknames 

 Kane is known as the Black Cherry Capital of the World because of its thick forest cover and strong logging industry.
 Kane has also been known for many years as the "Ice Box of Pennsylvania" because of extremely cold temperatures reported during winter months.

History 

Kane was founded by Brigadier General Thomas L. Kane and his wife Elizabeth Denniston Wood Kane, M.D.  Thomas L. Kane was the second son of Judge John Kintzing Kane of Philadelphia, a prominent associate of Presidents Jackson and Polk.  In 1846, then Colonel Kane aided the Mormons on their flight west from Nauvoo, Illinois, to the Great Salt Lake; he arranged for them to winter on Indian lands near Council Bluffs, Iowa.  In 1858, Colonel Kane prevented the "Utah War" between 2500 US Army soldiers, under A.S. Johnston, and the Mormons, under Kane's personal friend, Brigham Young.

Thomas L. Kane was offered the Utah Territorial Governorship, but insisted that the position go to Brigham Young.  Although never a religious convert to the Latter-day Saints, General Kane remained a personal, political, and legal adviser to Brigham Young until Young's death.  General Kane's older brother was Elisha Kent Kane, America's most prominent Arctic explorer before the Civil War.  The General's wife and three of their four children became physicians in Kane.  Their oldest son, Evan O'Neill Kane, M.D., demonstrated the efficacy of local anesthesia on two occasions by performing surgery on himself—once repairing an inguinal hernia, and once removing his own appendix.

The Kane mansion, Anoatok, Kane Armory, Thomas L. Kane Memorial Chapel, and the New Thomson House are listed on the National Register of Historic Places.

Due to its elevation, Kane had many summer vacationers in the 1950s and 1960s who stayed there for various periods during the late summer and fall months to avoid the effects of hay fever and allergies present at lower elevations in the days before air conditioning was prevalent.

Kane Tornado of 1985 

On May 31, 1985, a tornado destroyed many homes in Kane and neighboring East Kane. The F4 tornado passed through the town at approximately 8:15 PM. There were 3 deaths as a result of this tornado.  This is the worst natural disaster in Kane's history.

Tanker accident
On August 29, 2012, hundreds of residents of Kane were evacuated from their homes after a tanker truck carrying 8,400 gallons of butane overturned at the main intersection of town. The tanker truck was trying to negotiate a left-hand turn at Kane's only stop light from North Fraley Street (Route 6) to Greeves St. (Route 6) at roughly 4:30 a.m. The truck carrying the highly flammable gas rolled onto its side and came to a rest just feet from the New Thomson House. The Kane Area School District, on its second day of school, had to cancel classes and use the Kane Area High School as a shelter for the evacuated citizens. It was reported that if the gas was ignited, the blast radius would cover at least a half mile, essentially incinerating the business district of the town. At 4:45 p.m., PennDOT opened the road and citizens were permitted to return to their homes.

Industry 

The Holgate Toy Company was for many years based in Kane.  One of the more famous toys they manufactured was a wooden replica of the Mister Rogers Trolley car, seen in every single episode of Mister Rogers' Neighborhood. The company has since relocated to Bradford.

Kane Area School District
The Kane Area School District has two schools that house the district's 1,220 students (as of the 2013–14 school year). The Kane Area High School, which opened in 1972, is located just outside Kane in Wetmore Township. The high school sits on the former site of General Thomas Kane's homestead, which burned to the ground in 1896. The high school auditorium stage is roughly where Gen. Kane's front porch would have sat, looking out over the valley where the present-day football field and track sit. The high school houses grades nine through twelve.

The Kane Area Elementary-Middle School is located on West Hemlock Avenue and opened in 2010. The existing middle school was renovated in a multimillion-dollar project by the district, and a new elementary wing was added on the east side of the former junior high. The elementary-middle school houses students from kindergarten through eighth grade.

The construction of the new addition at the middle school was in response to the KASD Board of Directors voting to close the Mount Jewett Elementary School and the Chestnut St. Elementary School. Mount Jewett closed after the 2006–07 school year, while Chestnut St. closed after the 2009–10 school year. The Mount Jewett school has since been sold to a private businessman. The Chestnut St. Complex is currently owned by Kane Innovations and used as office space for Kane Innovations, the KASD, Head Start and the Intermediate Unit 9.

References

External links

 Kane Chamber of Commerce
 Kane Republican Newspaper
 Kane Area School District
 WXZY LP Radio Station
 Vacation information for Kane, PA
 ART IN THE WILDS Annual Juried Fine Arts Show in Kane, PA

Populated places established in 1863
Boroughs in McKean County, Pennsylvania
1887 establishments in Pennsylvania